A gonad, sex gland, or reproductive gland is a mixed gland that produces the gametes and sex hormones of an organism. Female reproductive cells are egg cells, and male reproductive cells are sperm. The male gonad, the testicle, produces sperm in the form of spermatozoa. The female gonad, the ovary, produces egg cells. Both of these gametes are haploid cells. Some hermaphroditic animals have a type of gonad called an ovotestis.

Evolution 
It is hard to find a common origin for gonads, but gonads most likely evolved independently several times.

Regulation 
The gonads are controlled by luteinizing hormone and follicle-stimulating hormone, produced and secreted by gonadotropes or gonadotrophins in the anterior pituitary gland. This secretion is regulated by gonadotropin-releasing hormone produced in the hypothalamus.

Development

Gonads start developing as a common primordium (an organ in the earliest stage of development), in the form of genital ridges, which are only later differentiated to male or female sex organs. The presence of the SRY gene, located on the Y chromosome and encoding the testis determining factor, determines male sexual differentiation. In the absence of the SRY gene from the Y chromosome, the female sex (ovaries instead of testes) will develop. The development of the gonads is a part of the development of the urinary and reproductive organs.

Disease

The gonads are subject to many diseases, such as hypergonadism, hypogonadism, agonadism, tumors, and cancer, among others.

Aging

Ovarian aging

A delay in having children is common in the developed world and this delay is often associated with ovarian infertility and subfertility.  Ovarian aging is characterized by progressive decline of the quality and number of oocytes.  This decline is likely due, in part, to reduced expression of genes that encode proteins necessary for DNA repair and meiosis.  Such reduced expression can lead to increased DNA damage and errors in meiotic recombination.

Testicular aging

The testes of older men often have sperm abnormalities that can ultimately lead to infertility.  These abnormalities include accumulation of DNA damage and decreased DNA repair ability.  During spermatogenesis in the testis, spontaneous new mutations arise and tend to accumulate with age.

See also

 Gonadosomatic Index
 Hypothalamic–pituitary–gonadal axis
 Sex organ

References

Glands
Endocrine system
Human reproductive system